The Erzurum offensive or Battle of Erzurum was a major winter offensive by the Imperial Russian Army on the Caucasus Campaign, during the First World War that led to the capture of the strategic city of Erzurum. The Ottoman forces, in winter quarters, suffered a series of unexpected reverses, which led to a Russian victory.

Background

After the defeat at the Battle of Sarikamish, the Ottomans tried to reorganise. The Armenian genocide made supplying their forces a problem. Trade by Armenians, which had supplied the Ottoman Army, was disrupted. The dismissal of Armenian soldiers into labor battalions and their massacres further worsened the problem. However, throughout 1915, the northern sectors of the front remained quiet.

At the same time, the end of the Gallipoli Campaign would free up considerable Turkish soldiers, which made Nikolai Yudenich, the commander of the Russian Caucasus Army, prepare to launch an offensive. He hoped to take the main fortress of Erzurum in the area, followed by Trabzon. That would be was a difficult campaign since Erzurum was protected by a number of forts in the mountains.

Eight of the available Ottoman divisions were designated for the Caucasus Front. Yudenich believed that he could launch an offensive before the Ottoman divisions could be redeployed and readied for battle.

Forces

Russian 
The Russians had 130,000 infantry and 35,000 cavalry. They also had 160,000 troops in reserve, 150 supply trucks and 20 planes of the Siberian Air Squadron. According to other sources, the attacking group (the Russian Caucasian army) included about 120 thousand people and 338 guns.

Ottoman 
The Ottoman forces had 78,000 troops in the region.

Operations 
The Ottoman High Command did not expect any Russian operations during winter. Mahmut Kamil was in Istanbul, and his chief of staff, Colonel , was in Germany. General Yudenich launched a major winter offensive.

Defense lines 

The Russians had a slight edge in numbers but could not rely on numbers alone. For that reason, the Russian plan was to break through a weak part of the line.

On January 10, the initial offensive was directed at the XI Corps. The first engagement was at the Azkani village and its mountain crest of Kara Urgan.

On January 17, at Battle of Koprukoy The forces at Köprüköy, the main town on the road to Erzurum, were forced to leave. By 18 January, the Russian forces approached Hasankale, a town on the road to Erzurum and the new location of the Third Army headquarters. on January 23 Kargabazar Dag Hinis. 

On January 29, Mahmut Kamil Paşa returned from Istanbul. He could feel that the Russians would not only attack Erzurum but also renew the offensive southern flank around Lake Van. Hınıs, to the south, was taken on February 7 to prevent reinforcements from Muş from coming in. Mahmut Kamil tried to strengthen the defensive lines. That drew most of the Ottoman reserves and diverted their attention away from the decisive attack farther north. 

North of the Deveboynu Ridge, the Russian columns approached over the Kargapazar Ridge, which the Ottomans had considered impassable. The X Corps guarded that sector of the line, and its commander had positioned his divisions so that they could not support one another. Mahmut Kamil had five divisions in the Deve-Boyun ridge area but was slow to react to events north of that position.

City of Erzurum 
The fortress was under Russian threat, both from north and east. With the victories, the Russian Army had cleared the approaches to Erzurum. The Russians were now planning to take Erzurum, a heavily-fortified stronghold. Erzurum was considered as the second best-defended town in the Ottoman Empire. The fortress was defended by 235 pieces of artillery. Its fortifications covered the city on a 180° arc in two rings.  There were eleven forts and batteries covering the central area.  The flanks were guarded by a group of two forts on each flank. The Ottoman Third Army lacked the soldiers to adequately man the perimeter.

On February 11, the Russians began to shell the fortified formations around Erzurum. Fierce fighting erupted. Ottoman battalions of 350 men had to defend against Russian battalions of 1,000 men. There were few reinforcements for the beleaguered Ottomans. In three days, the Russians had managed to reach the heights overlooking the Erzurum plain. It was now obvious to the Third Army's leaders that the town had been lost. The Ottoman units began to retreat from the fortified zones at the front and to evacuate the town of Erzurum.

On February 12, Fort Kara-gobek was taken. On the 13th, the Russians continued their attacks.

On February 14, Fort Tafet was taken, and the Russians had now penetrated through both rings of the cities's defenses.

By February 15, the remaining forts surrounding Erzurum were evacuated.

Early in the morning of the 16th, Russian Cossacks were among the first to enter the city. Ottoman units had successfully withdrawn and avoided encirclement, but casualties were already high, and 327 pieces of artillery had been lost to the Russians. Support units of the Third Army and around 250 wounded at the town's hospital were taken prisoner.

Although aerial reconnaissance revealed the Ottomans retreat, the Russian pursuit was not effective as it could have been. Meanwhile, remnants of the X and XI Corps established another defensive line, 8 km east of Erzurum.

Casualties

The initial phase of the offensive, known as the Battle of Koprukoy, resulted in 20,000 casualties for the Ottomans and 12,000 for the Russians. At the end of the offensive, during the storming of the city of Erzurum itself, the Russians captured some 9 standards and 100+ guns. The Ottomans lost about 10,000 men. Of the Russians, 1,000 were killed, 4,000 wounded and 4,000 affected by frostbite.Allen and Muratoff, page 363.

Aftermath
The Ottoman Empire did not have a chance to enjoy its victory at the Battle of Gallipoli since its loss of Erzurum changed the atmosphere in an instant. The V Corps (consisting of 10th and 13th Divisions) was deployed from Gallipoli. On 27 February, Mahmut Kamil was replaced with Vehip Paşa. The new location of the headquarters became Erzincan. As a further result of the Erzurum Campaign, Trabzon fell in April.

In literature

The Battle of Erzurum forms the climax of John Buchan's novel Greenmantle.

References

Sources 
 
 W.E.D. Allen and Paul Muratoff, Caucasian Battlefields, A History of Wars on the Turco-Caucasian Border, 1828-1921, 351-363.

External links

 
The Great War’ vol. 6, edited by H.W. Wilson, Chapter 109 'The Renewed Russian Offensive and the Fall of Erzerum' by F. A. McKenzie
The Children’s Story of the War’ vol 5 'The Advance on Erzurum' by Sir Edward Parrott, M.A. L.L.D.

Conflicts in 1916
Battles of the Caucasus Campaign
Battles of World War I involving the Ottoman Empire
Battles of World War I involving Russia
1916 in the Russian Empire
1916 in Armenia
History of Erzurum
1916 in the Ottoman Empire
Erzurum vilayet
History of Erzurum Province
January 1916 events
February 1916 events